Kilbarrack railway station, in Kilbarrack, a suburb of Dublin city, Ireland, serves Kilbarrack and parts of Raheny and Donaghmede.  Although on the Dublin-Belfast line, it is a stop only on the DART suburban railway system.

Facilities
Kilbarrack is a small station, with two parallel platforms and a footbridge at the top of the platforms. There is a gate at the top of the northbound platform to allow wheelchair access to the station. On the southbound platform there is a station building with ticket machines and an office, scheduled to open between 05:45-00:30, Monday to Sunday.  There are 2 shelters on each platform along with outdoor seating benches. Also there are SOS and information buttons in the station along with LED displays.

History
The station opened on 1 June 1969 as a basic halt. In the 1980s the station was upgraded in preparation for DART services with a new station building and shelters. The station was upgraded again in 2004.

See also
 List of railway stations in Ireland

References

External links
 Irish Rail Kilbarrack Station website
 Eiretrains - Kilbarrack Station

Iarnród Éireann stations in Dublin (city)
Railway stations opened in 1969
Kilbarrack
1969 establishments in Ireland
Railway stations in the Republic of Ireland opened in the 20th century